The 1999 Lipton Championships women's singles was the women's singles event of the fifteenth edition of the tennis tournament played at Miami, United States. It is the third WTA Tier I tournament of the year, and part of the US Spring tennis season. Venus Williams was the defending champion, and she successfully defending her title by defeating her sister Serena in the final 6–1, 4–6, 6–4.

Seeds

All seeds received a bye to the second round.

Draw

Finals

Top half

Section 1

Section 2

Section 3

Section 4

Bottom half

Section 5

Section 6

Section 7

Section 8

Qualifying

Seeds

Qualifiers

Lucky losers
  Christína Papadáki

Qualifying draw

First qualifier

Second qualifier

Third qualifier

Fourth qualifier

Fifth qualifier

Sixth qualifier

Seventh qualifier

Eighth qualifier

References
 1999 Lipton Championships Draw

Women's Singles
Lipton Championships - Women's Singles